Crooked Creek is a  tributary of the Mississippi River in northwestern Minnesota.

See also
List of rivers of Minnesota

References

Minnesota Watersheds
USGS Hydrologic Unit Map - State of Minnesota (1974)

Rivers of Cass County, Minnesota
Rivers of Minnesota
Tributaries of the Mississippi River